Melanodexia is a peculiar New World cluster fly genus of the western United States, formerly included in the family Calliphoridae.

Description
Like the related genus Pollenia, Melanodexia has hairy parafacialia, and in females lateroclinate setae of the fronto-orbital plates.

Species
Melanodexia californica Hall, 1948
Melanodexia glabricula (Bigot, 1887)
Melanodexia grandis Shannon, 1926 (Synonyms: M. pacifica Hall, 1948)
Melanodexia idahoensis (Hall, 1948)
Melanodexia nox (Hall, 1948)
Melanodexia satanica Shannon, 1926
Melanodexia tristina (Hall, 1948)
Melanodexia tristis Williston, 1893

References

Diptera of North America
Oestroidea genera
Polleniidae
Taxa named by Samuel Wendell Williston